Underground is the fifth solo album by English rock singer Graham Bonnet, originally released in 1997. Underground reunites Bonnet with guitarist Danny Johnson, who previously performed with Bonnet in Alcatrazz. "Lost in Hollywood" is a re-recording of a song Bonnet recorded during his tenure with Rainbow.

Track listing
"Underground" (Jo Eime, Danny Johnson, Pat Regan, Kevin Valentine) – 4:13
"Whiplash" – 3:35 (Eime, Johnson)
"Breakaway" (Eime) – 3:31 
"Movin' On" (Eime) – 3:30
"The Strange" (Eime, Johnson, Regan) – 5:23
"Sail On" (Johnson) – 4:51
"The Wind Cries Mary" (Jimi Hendrix) – 3:16
"Cajun Pink" (Eime, Johnson, Valentine) – 4:23
"Winter Skin" (Eime, Johnson) – 4:18 
"Lost in Hollywood" (Ritchie Blackmore, Roger Glover, Cozy Powell) – 4:54

Personnel
Graham Bonnet – vocals
Danny Johnson – guitars
Kevin Valentine – drums
Jamie Carter – bass on "Underground", "Whiplash", "Breakaway", "Cajun Pink" and "Lost in Hollywood"
Tony Franklin – bass on "Movin' On", "The Strange", "Sail On" and "Winter Skin"
Todd Jensen – bass on "The Wind Cries Mary"
Pat Regan – keyboards
Eric Gorfain – violin

Graham Bonnet albums
1997 albums